Air Forces Monthly is a military aviation magazine published by Key Publishing, and based in Stamford, Lincolnshire, United Kingdom. It was established in 1988. It provides news and analysis on military aviation, technology and related topics.

The Independent claims that "Air Forces Monthly is widely read in the MoD and in the defence industry, both in Britain and in the US."

In 1997, an AFM report that a military aircraft crash at Boscombe Down in September 1994 involved a classified Aurora aircraft prompted denials from the Ministry of Defence and the United States Defense Department.

Sister publications include Air International, Air Enthusiast, Airliner World, and FlyPast.

References

External links

List of Air Forces Monthly issues with article index via www.theaviationindex.com/

1988 establishments in the United Kingdom
Aviation magazines
Monthly magazines published in the United Kingdom
Transport magazines published in the United Kingdom
Magazines established in 1988
Military magazines published in the United Kingdom
Mass media in Lincolnshire